Lampromicra senator is an Australian species of insect in the family Scutelleridae. commonly known as the green jewel bug.

Distribution
The species is found in the states of New South Wales, Queensland, Northern Territory and Western Australia.

References

Scutelleridae
Insects described in 1803